Paranepanthia is a genus of starfish of the family Asterinidae. Members of the genus have five rays and are found in the waters around Australia, Indonesia and Antarctic New Zealand.

Characteristics
Members of the genus Paranepanthia are characterized by having five medium-length, broad-based rays that are narrowly flat on the oral (under) surface, with pointed or rounded ends. Pedicellariae are not present and the papular spaces are large with several small papulae. The marginal plates are in regular series, with tufts of short, needle-shaped spinelets, but the plates on the aboral (upper) surface are irregular. The type species is Nepanthia platydisca Fisher, 1913.

Distribution

Species
The World Asteroidea Dartabase lists the following species:

Paranepanthia aucklandensis (Koehler, 1920)
Paranepanthia brachiata (Koehler, 1910)
Paranepanthia grandis (H.L. Clark, 1928)
Paranepanthia platydisca (Fisher, 1913)
Paranepanthia praetermissa (Livingstone, 1933)

References

Asterinidae